This is a list of diseases of carrots (Daucus carota subsp. sativus).

Bacterial diseases

Fungal diseases

Nematodes, parasitic

|Cyst nematode 
||
Heterodera carotae 
|-
|Lance nematode 
||
Hoplolaimus uniformis 
|-
|Lesion nematode 
||
Pratylenchus penetrans 
Pratylenchus spp. 
|-
|Root knot 
||
Meloidogyne hapla 
|-
|Sting nematode 
||
Belonolaimus longicaudatus 
|-
|}
[Xiphinema spp.]

[Trichodorus spp.]

Virus and viroid diseases

Phytoplasmal and spiroplasmal diseases

Miscellaneous diseases and disorders

References 

 Common Names of Diseases, The American Phytopathological Society
 Carrot Diseases (Fact Sheets and Information Bulletins), The Cornell Plant Pathology Vegetable Disease Web Page

Carrot
 List